This is a list of topics related to Maldives. Those interested in the subject can monitor changes to the pages by clicking on Related changes in the sidebar.

Buildings and structures in the Maldives
 Islamic Centre (Maldives)
 Ithaa
 National Library of Maldives
 National museum (Maldives)
 Theemuge
 Equatorial Convention Centre

Airports in the Maldives
 List of airports in the Maldives

International airports
 Gan International Airport
 Hanimaadhoo International Airport
 Maafaru International Airport
 Velana International Airport

Domestic airports
 Dhaalu Airport
 Dharavandhoo Airport
 Funadhoo Airport
 Fuvahmulah Airport
 Ifuru Airport
 Kaadedhdhoo Airport
 Kadhdhoo Airport
 Kooddoo Airport
 Kulhudhuffushi Airport
 Villa International Airport Maamigili
 Maavarulu Airport
 Madivaru Airport
 Thimarafushi Airport

Hospitals in the Maldives
 Indira Gandhi Memorial Hospital
 ADK Hospital
 Haa Alif Atoll Hospital
 Kulhudhuffushi Regional Hospital
 Shaviyani Atoll Hospital
 Noonu Atoll Hospital
 Ungoofaaru Regional Hospital
 Baa Atoll Hospital
 Lhaviyani Atoll Hospital
 Alif Alif Atoll Hospital
 Alif Dhaalu Atoll Hospital
 Vaavu Atoll Hospital
 Muli Regional Hospital
 Faafu Atoll Hospital
 Dhaalu Atoll Hospital
 Thaa Atoll Hospital
 Gan Regional Hospital
 Gaaf Alif Atoll Hospital
 Thinadhoo Regional Hospital
 Nyaviyani Atoll Hospital
 Hithadhoo Regional Hospital

Libraries in the Maldives
 National Law Library of the Maldives
 National Library of Maldives

Restaurants in the Maldives
 Ithaa

Cities and towns in the Maldives
 List of cities, towns and villages in the Maldives
 Malé
 Addu City
 Fuvahmulah
 Kulhudhuffushi
 Maroshi
 Male Capital City of Maldives

Communications in the Maldives
 Communications in the Maldives
 .mv

Maldivian media
 Newspapers in the Maldives
Maldivian journalists
 Imad Latheef
 Television Maldives

Telecommunications companies of the Maldives
 Dhiraagu
 Raajjé Online
 Ooredoo Maldives

Maldivian culture
 Maldivian cuisine
 Boduberu
 Culture of the Maldives
 Dhivehi Writing Systems
 Dhives Akuru
 Emblem of Maldives
 Flag of Maldives
 Folklore of the Maldives
 Garudhiya
 Gaumii salaam
 Thaana

Maldivian demons
 Rannamaari

Languages of the Maldives
 Dhivehi language

Maldivian music
 Music of the Maldives

Maldivian writers

Ahmed Mujuthaba (Kurinbee Live)

Economy of the Maldives
 Economy of Maldives
 Bank of Maldives
 Currency of Maldives
 Economic aid to Maldives
 Finance in Maldives
 Industries in Maldives
 List of South Asian stock exchanges
 Maldives Monetary Authority
 Maldivian laari
 Maldivian rufiyaa

Companies of the Maldives
 Maldives Industrial Fisheries Company
 State Trading Organization

Banks of Maldives
 Bank of Maldives
 Maldives Islamic Bank

Trade unions of the Maldives
 Trade unions in Maldives

Education in the Maldives
 Education in the Maldives
 Maldives College of Higher Education

Schools in the Maldives
 List of schools in the Maldives
 Aminiyya School
 Dharumavantha School
 Ghiyasuddin School
 Majeedhiyya School
 Malé English School

Environment of the Maldives

Biota of the Maldives

Fauna of the Maldives
 List of birds of the Maldives

Ethnic groups in the Maldives
 Ethnic groups of South Asia

Geography of the Maldives
 Geography of the Maldives
 Demographics of the Maldives
 Huvafen Fushi

Atolls of the Maldives
 Atolls of the Maldives
 Alif Alif Atoll
 Alif Dhaal Atoll
 Ari (atoll)
 Baa Atoll
 Dhaalu Atoll
 Faafu Atoll
 Gaafu Alif Atoll
 Gaafu Dhaalu Atoll
 Gnaviyani Atoll
 Haa Alif Atoll
 Haa Dhaalu Atoll
 Huvadhoo Atoll
 Kaafu Atoll
 Laamu Atoll
 Lhaviyani Atoll
 Meemu Atoll
 Noonu Atoll
 Raa Atoll
 Seenu Atoll
 Shaviyani Atoll
 Thaa Atoll
 Vaavu Atoll

Islands of the Maldives
 Alifushi (Raa Atoll)
 Angolhitheemu (Raa Atoll)
 Baarah (Haa Alif Atoll)
 Bandidhoo (Dhaalu Atoll)
 Berinmadhoo (Haa Alif Atoll)
 Bileddhoo (Faafu Atoll)
 Bileffahi (Shaviyani Atoll)
 Bodufulhadhoo (Alif Alif Atoll)
 Burunee (Thaa Atoll)
 Dhuvaafaru (Raa Atoll)
 Dhaandhoo (Gaafu Alif Atoll)
 Dhanbidhoo (Laamu Atoll)
 Dhangethi (Alif Dhaal Atoll)
 Dharanboodhoo (Faafu Atoll)
 Dharavandhoo (Baa Atoll)
 Dhevvadhoo (Gaafu Alif Atoll)
 Dhiddhoo (Alif Dhaal Atoll)
 Dhiddhoo (Haa Alif Atoll)
 Dhiffushi (Kaafu Atoll)
 Dhiggaru (Meemu Atoll)
 Dhigurah (Alif Dhaal Atoll)
 Dhiyadhoo (Gaafu Alif Atoll)
 Dhiyamingili (Thaa Atoll)
 Dhonfanu (Baa Atoll)
 Eydhafushi (Baa Atoll)
 Fainu (Raa Atoll)
 Fares (Gaafu Dhaalu Atoll)
 Faridhoo (Haa Dhaalu Atoll)
 Feeali (Faafu Atoll)
 Feevah (Shaviyani Atoll)
 Fehendhoo (Baa Atoll)
 Felidhoo (Vaavu Atoll)
 Fenfushi (Alif Dhaal Atoll)
 Feridhoo (Alif Alif Atoll)
 Feydhoo (Seenu Atoll)
 Feydhoo (Shaviyani Atoll)
 Filladhoo (Haa Alif Atoll)
 Finey (Haa Dhaalu Atoll)
 Firunbaidhoo (Shaviyani Atoll)
 Fiyoaree (Gaafu Dhaalu Atoll)
 Foakaidhoo (Shaviyani Atoll)
 Foddhoo (Noonu Atoll)
 Fulhadhoo (Baa Atoll)
 Fulidhoo (Vaavu Atoll)
 Funadhoo (Shaviyani Atoll)
 Fuvammulah (Gnaviyani Atoll)
 Gaadhiffushi (Thaa Atoll)
 Gaadhoo (Laamu Atoll)
 Gaafaru (Kaafu Atoll)
 Gaddhoo (Gaafu Dhaalu Atoll)
 Gan (Laamu Atoll)
 Gan (Seenu Atoll)
 Gemanafushi (Gaafu Alif Atoll)
 Gemendhoo (Dhaalu Atoll)
 Goidhoo (Baa Atoll)
 Goidhoo (Shaviyani Atoll)
 Gulhi (Kaafu Atoll)
 Guraidhoo (Kaafu Atoll)
 Guraidhoo (Thaa Atoll)
 Haggnaameedhoo (Alif Dhaal Atoll)
 Hanimaadhoo (Haa Dhaalu Atoll)
 Hathifushi (Haa Alif Atoll)
 Henbandhoo (Noonu Atoll)
 Himandhoo (Alif Alif Atoll)
 Himmafushi (Kaafu Atoll)
 Hinnavaru (Lhaviyani Atoll)
 Hirilandhoo (Thaa Atoll)
 Hirimaradhoo (Haa Dhaalu Atoll)
 Hithaadhoo (Baa Atoll)
 Hithadhoo (Laamu Atoll)
 Hithadhoo (Seenu Atoll)
 Hoandeddhoo (Gaafu Dhaalu Atoll)
 Hoarafushi (Haa Alif Atoll)
 Holhudhoo (Noonu Atoll)
 Hulhudheli (Dhaalu Atoll)
 Hulhudhoo (Seenu Atoll)
 Hulhudhuffaaru (Raa Atoll)
 Hulhulé Island
 Hulhumalé
 Hulhumeedhoo (Seenu Atoll)
 Huraa (Kaafu Atoll)
 Ihavandhoo (Haa Alif Atoll)
 Inguraidhoo (Raa Atoll)
 Innamaadhoo (Raa Atoll)
 Isdhoo (Laamu Atoll)
 Kaashidhoo (Kaafu Atoll)
 Kalaidhoo (Laamu Atoll)
 Kamadhoo (Baa Atoll)
 Kandholhudhoo (Raa Atoll)
 Kanditheemu (Shaviyani Atoll)
 Kandoodhoo (Thaa Atoll)
 Kanduhulhudhoo (Gaafu Alif Atoll)
 Kelaa (Haa Alif Atoll)
 Kendhikolhudhoo (Noonu Atoll)
 Kendhoo (Baa Atoll)
 Keyodhoo (Vaavu Atoll)
 Kihaadhoo (Baa Atoll)
 Kinbidhoo (Thaa Atoll)
 Kinolhas (Raa Atoll)
 Kolamaafushi (Gaafu Alif Atoll)
 Kolhufushi (Meemu Atoll)
 Komandoo (Shaviyani Atoll)
 Kudafaree (Noonu Atoll)
 Kudahuvadhoo (Dhaalu Atoll)
 Kudarikilu (Baa Atoll)
 Kulhudhuffushi (Haa Dhaalu Atoll)
 Kumundhoo (Haa Dhaalu Atoll)
 Kunahandhoo (Laamu Atoll)
 Kunburudhoo (Alif Dhaal Atoll)
 Kunburudhoo (Haa Dhaalu Atoll)
 Kurendhoo (Lhaviyani Atoll)
 Kurinbi (Haa Dhaalu Atoll)
 Landhoo (Noonu Atoll)
 Lhaimagu (Shaviyani Atoll)
 Lhohi (Noonu Atoll)
 Lhohifushi
 Maabaidhoo (Laamu Atoll)
 Maaenboodhoo (Dhaalu Atoll)
 Maafaru (Noonu Atoll)
 Maafilaafushi (Lhaviyani Atoll)
 Maafushi (Kaafu Atoll)
 Maakandoodhoo
 Maakurathu (Raa Atoll)
 Maalhendhoo (Noonu Atoll)
 Maalhos (Alif Alif Atoll)
 Maalhos (Baa Atoll)
 Maamendhoo (Gaafu Alif Atoll)
 Maamendhoo (Laamu Atoll)
 Maamingili (Alif Dhaal Atoll)
 Maarandhoo (Haa Alif Atoll)
 Maathodaa (Gaafu Dhaalu Atoll)
 Maaungoodhoo (Shaviyani Atoll)
 Maavah (Laamu Atoll)
 Maavaidhoo (Haa Dhaalu Atoll)
 Madaveli (Gaafu Dhaalu Atoll)
 Madifushi (Meemu Atoll)
 Madifushi (Thaa Atoll)
 Maduvvaree (Meemu Atoll)
 Maduvvaree (Raa Atoll)
 Magoodhoo (Faafu Atoll)
 Magoodhoo (Noonu Atoll)
 Mahibadhoo (Alif Dhaal Atoll)
 Makunudhoo (Haa Dhaalu Atoll)
 Malé
 Manadhoo (Noonu Atoll)
 Mandhoo (Alif Dhaal Atoll)
 Maradhoo (Seenu Atoll)
 Maradhoo-Feydhoo (Seenu Atoll)
 Maroshi (Shaviyani Atoll)
 Mathiveri (Alif Alif Atoll)
 Meedhoo (Dhaalu Atoll)
 Meedhoo (Raa Atoll)
 Meedhoo (Seenu Atoll)
 Miladhoo (Noonu Atoll)
 Milandhoo (Shaviyani Atoll)
 Mulah (Meemu Atoll)
 Mulhadhoo (Haa Alif Atoll)
 Muli (Meemu Atoll)
 Mundoo (Laamu Atoll)
 Muraidhoo (Haa Alif Atoll)
 Naalaafushi (Meemu Atoll)
 Nadellaa (Gaafu Dhaalu Atoll)
 Naifaru (Lhaviyani Atoll)
 Naivaadhoo (Haa Dhaalu Atoll)
 Narudhoo (Shaviyani Atoll)
 Nellaidhoo (Haa Dhaalu Atoll)
 Neykurendhoo (Haa Dhaalu Atoll)
 Nilandhoo (Faafu Atoll)
 Nilandhoo (Gaafu Alif Atoll)
 Nolhivaram (Haa Dhaalu Atoll)
 Nolhivaranfaru (Haa Dhaalu Atoll)
 Noomaraa (Shaviyani Atoll)
 Olhuvelifushi (Lhaviyani Atoll)
 Omadhoo (Alif Dhaal Atoll)
 Omadhoo (Thaa Atoll)
 Raimmandhoo (Meemu Atoll)
 Rakeedhoo (Vaavu Atoll)
 Rasdhoo (Alif Alif Atoll)
 Rasgetheemu (Raa Atoll)
 Rathafandhoo (Gaafu Dhaalu Atoll)
 Rinbudhoo (Dhaalu Atoll)
 Thakandhoo (Haa Alif Atoll)
 Thilafushi
 Thimarafushi (Thaa Atoll)
 Thinadhoo (Gaafu Dhaalu Atoll)
 Thinadhoo (Vaavu Atoll)
 Thinrukéréhaa
 Thoddoo (Alif Alif Atoll)
 Thulhaadhoo (Baa Atoll)
 Thulusdhoo (Kaafu Atoll)
 Thuraakunu (Haa Alif Atoll)
 Ukulhas (Alif Alif Atoll)
 Uligamu (Haa Alif Atoll)
 Ungoofaaru (Raa Atoll)
 Utheemu (Haa Alif Atoll)
 Vaadhoo (Gaafu Dhaalu Atoll)
 Vaadhoo (Raa Atoll)
 Vaanee (Dhaalu Atoll)
 Veymandoo (Thaa Atoll)

Maps of the Maldives

Uninhabited islands of the Maldives
 Aarah (Kaafu Atoll)
 Aarah (Raa Atoll)
 Aarah (Vaavu Atoll)
 Aboohéra
 Akirifushi
 Alikoirah (Alif Dhaal Atoll)
 Aluvifushi
 Angaagaa
 Araigaiththaa
 Ariadhoo
 Asdhoo
 Athurugau
 Baavandhoo
 Baberaahuttaa
 Badidhiffusheefinolhu
 Bakeiththaa
 Baros (island)
 Beyruhuttaa
 Beyrumaddoo
 Bihuréhaa
 Biyaadhoo
 Boaddoo
 Bodubandos
 Bodufinolhu (Alif Dhaal Atoll)
 Bodufinolhu (Kaafu Atoll)
 Bodufushi (Dhaalu Atoll)
 Boduhithi
 Boduhuraa (Kaafu Atoll)
 Bodukaashihuraa
 Bodéhuttaa
 Bolifushi
 Budhiyahuttaa
 Bulhaaholhi
 Bulhalafushi
 Dhebaidhoo
 Dhehasanulunboihuraa
 Dhevvalaabadhoo
 Dhevvamaagalaa
 Dhiddhoofinolhu
 Dhiffushi (Alif Dhaal Atoll)
 Dhiggaru (Alif Dhaal Atoll)
 Dhigudhoo
 Dhigufinolhu
 Dhigurah (Gaafu Alif Atoll)
 Dhiguvarufinolhu
 Dhigémaahuttaa
 Dhonhuseenahuttaa
 Dhoonidhoo
 Dhoores
 Ehrruh-haa
 Enboodhoo (Alif Dhaal Atoll)
 Enboodhoo (Kaafu Atoll)
 Enboodhoofinolhu
 Enboodhoofushi
 Enbulufushi
 Eriyadhoo (Kaafu Atoll)
 Faandhoo
 Faanuvaahuraa
 Falhumaafushi
 Falhuverrehaa
 Farudhulhudhoo
 Farukolhufushi
 Fenrahaa
 Fenrahaahuttaa
 Feydhoofinolhu
 Fihalhohi
 Filitheyo
 Finolhu
 Fulhadhoorah kairi finonolhu
 Funadhoo (Kaafu Atoll)
 Funadhoovillingili
 Funamaddoo
 Furan-nafushi
 Fénéhuttaa
 Gaadhiffushi (Dhaalu Atoll)
 Galamadhoo
 Gasfinolhu (Alif Dhaal Atoll)
 Gasfinolhu (Kaafu Atoll)
 Giraavaru (Kaafu Atoll)
 Girifushi
 Gulheegaathuhuraa
 Haagevillaa
 Hadahaa
 Hagedhoo
 Heenamaagalaa
 Heenfaru
 Helengeli
 Henbadhoo
 Himithi
 Hirihuttaa
 Hiriyanfushi (Dhaalu Atoll)
 Hithaadhoo (Gaafu Alif Atoll)
 Hithaadhoogalaa
 Hiyafushi
 Hudhufusheefinolhu
 Hukurudhoo
 Hulhimendhoo (Gaafu Alif Atoll)
 Hulhuvehi
 Hunadhoo
 Huraagandu
 Hurasdhoo
 Hurendhoo
 Huruelhi
 Huvahendhoo
 Idimaa
 Ihuru
 Innafushi (Alif Dhaal Atoll)
 Innaréhaa
 Issari
 Jinnathugau
 Kagi (island)
 Kalhehuttaa
 Kalhudhiréhaa
 Kalhuhandhihuraa
 Kalhuhuraa (Kaafu Atoll)
 Kandinma
 Kandoomaafushi
 Kandoomoonufushi
 Kanduoih-giri
 Kanduvillingili
 Kanifinolhu
 Kanneiyfaru
 Kanuhuraa (Kaafu Atoll)
 Kedhigandu
 Keesseyréhaa
 Kendheraa
 Kiraidhoo
 Koduhuttaa
 Kondeymatheelaabadhoo
 Kondeyvillingili
 Kudabandos
 Kudadhoo (Alif Dhaal Atoll)
 Kudafinolhu (Kaafu Atoll)
 Kudahithi
 Kudahuraa (Kaafu Atoll)
 Kudalafari
 Kudarah (Alif Dhaal Atoll)
 Kuddoo
 Kudhébondeyyo
 Kudhéfehélaa
 Kudhéhuttaa
 Kureddhoo (Gaafu Alif Atoll)
 Lankanfinolhu
 Lankanfushi
 Lhohi (Dhaalu Atoll)
 Lhosfushi
 Lhossaa
 Maadheli
 Maadhiguvaru
 Maadhoo (Kaafu Atoll)
 Maafushi (Dhaalu Atoll)
 Maafushi (Faafu Atoll)
 Maafushivaru
 Maaféhélaa
 Maagau
 Maagehuttaa
 Maakanaarataa
 Maamendhoo (Seenu Atoll)
 Maamutaa
 Maarandhoo (Gaafu Alif Atoll)
 Maaréhaa
 Maavaruhuraa
 Machchafushi
 Madivaru (Kaafu Atoll)
 Madivaruhuraa
 Mahaanaélhihuraa
 Mahaddhoo
 Makunudhoo (Kaafu Atoll)
 Makunueri
 Makunufushi
 Maléfaru
 Maththidhoo
 Maththuréhaa
 Medhufinolhu (Alif Dhaal Atoll)
 Medhufinolhu (Kaafu Atol)
 Medhuréhaa
 Meedhuffushi
 Meedhupparu
 Meerufenfushi (Kaafu Atoll)
 Melaimu
 Meradhoo
 Minimasgali (Dhaalu Atoll)
 Minimasgali (Faafu Atoll)
 Minimensaa
 Mirihi
 Moofushi
 Muddhoo
 Munaagala
 Munandhoo
 Muthaafushi
 Médhuburiyaa
 Médhuhuttaa
 Naibukaloabodufushi
 Nakachchaafushi
 Nalaguraidhoo
 Odagallaa
 Olhahali
 Olhuveli (Dhaalu Atoll)
 Olhuveli (Kaafu Atoll)

Maldives geography stubs
 Aarah (Kaafu Atoll)
 Aarah (Raa Atoll)
 Aarah (Vaavu Atoll)
 Akirifushi
 Alif Alif Atoll
 Alif Dhaal Atoll
 Alifushi (Raa Atoll)
 Alikoirah (Alif Dhaal Atoll)
 Aluvifushi
 Angaagaa
 Angolhitheemu (Raa Atoll)
 Araigaiththaa
 Ari (atoll)
 Ariadhoo
 Asdhoo
 Athurugau
 Baa Atoll
 Baarah (Haa Alif Atoll)
 Baavandhoo
 Baberaahuttaa
 Badidhiffusheefinolhu
 Bakeiththaa
 Bandidhoo (Dhaalu Atoll)
 Baros (island)
 Berinmadhoo (Haa Alif Atoll)
 Beyruhuttaa
 Beyrumaddoo
 Bihuréhaa
 Bileddhoo (Faafu Atoll)
 Bileffahi (Shaviyani Atoll)
 Biyaadhoo
 Boaddoo
 Bodubandos
 Bodufinolhu (Alif Dhaal Atoll)
 Bodufinolhu (Kaafu Atoll)
 Bodufulhadhoo (Alif Alif Atoll)
 Bodufushi (Dhaalu Atoll)
 Boduhithi
 Bodukaashihuraa
 Bodéhuttaa
 Bolifushi
 Budhiyahuttaa
 Bulhaaholhi
 Bulhalafushi
 Burunee (Thaa Atoll)
 Dhaalu Atoll
 Dhaandhoo (Gaafu Alif Atoll)
 Dhanbidhoo (Laamu Atoll)
 Dhangethi (Alif Dhaal Atoll)
 Dharanboodhoo (Faafu Atoll)
 Dharavandhoo (Baa Atoll)
 Dhebaidhoo
 Dhehasanulunboihuraa
 Dhevvadhoo (Gaafu Alif Atoll)
 Dhevvalaabadhoo
 Dhevvamaagalaa
 Dhiddhoo (Alif Dhaal Atoll)
 Dhiddhoo (Haa Alif Atoll)
 Dhiddhoofinolhu
 Dhiffushi (Alif Dhaal Atoll)
 Dhiffushi (Kaafu Atoll)
 Dhiggaru (Alif Dhaal Atoll)
 Dhiggaru (Meemu Atoll)
 Dhigudhoo
 Dhigufinolhu
 Dhigurah (Alif Dhaal Atoll)
 Dhigurah (Gaafu Alif Atoll)
 Dhiguvarufinolhu
 Dhigémaahuttaa
 Dhiyadhoo (Gaafu Alif Atoll)
 Dhiyamingili (Thaa Atoll)
 Dhonfanu (Baa Atoll)
 Dhonhuseenahuttaa
 Dhoonidhoo
 Dhoores
 Ehrruh-haa
 Enboodhoo (Alif Dhaal Atoll)
 Enboodhoo (Kaafu Atoll)
 Enboodhoofinolhu
 Enboodhoofushi
 Enbulufushi
 Eriyadhoo (Kaafu Atoll)
 Eydhafushi (Baa Atoll)
 Faafu Atoll
 Faandhoo
 Faanuvaahuraa
 Fainu (Raa Atoll)
 Falhumaafushi
 Falhuverrehaa
 Fares (Gaafu Dhaalu Atoll)
 Faridhoo (Haa Dhaalu Atoll)
 Farudhulhudhoo
 Farukolhufushi
 Feeali (Faafu Atoll)
 Feevah (Shaviyani Atoll)
 Fehendhoo (Baa Atoll)
 Felidhoo (Vaavu Atoll)
 Fenfushi (Alif Dhaal Atoll)
 Fenrahaa
 Fenrahaahuttaa
 Feridhoo (Alif Alif Atoll)
 Feydhoo (Seenu Atoll)
 Feydhoo (Shaviyani Atoll)
 Feydhoofinolhu
 Filladhoo (Haa Alif Atoll)
 Finey (Haa Dhaalu Atoll)
 Finolhu
 Firunbaidhoo (Shaviyani Atoll)
 Fiyoaree (Gaafu Dhaalu Atoll)
 Foakaidhoo (Shaviyani Atoll)
 Foddhoo (Noonu Atoll)
 Fonadhoo (Laamu Atoll)
 Fulhadhoo (Baa Atoll)
 Fulhadhoorah kairi finonolhu
 Fulidhoo (Vaavu Atoll)
 Funadhoo (Kaafu Atoll)
 Funadhoo (Shaviyani Atoll)
 Funadhoovillingili
 Funamaddoo
 Furan-nafushi
 Fénéhuttaa
 Gaadhiffushi (Dhaalu Atoll)
 Gaadhiffushi (Thaa Atoll)
 Gaadhoo (Laamu Atoll)
 Gaafaru (Kaafu Atoll)
 Gaafu Alif Atoll
 Gaafu Dhaalu Atoll
 Gaddhoo (Gaafu Dhaalu Atoll)
 Galamadhoo
 Gan (Laamu Atoll)
 Gan (Seenu Atoll)
 Gasfinolhu (Alif Dhaal Atoll)
 Gasfinolhu (Kaafu Atoll)
 Gemanafushi (Gaafu Alif Atoll)
 Gemendhoo (Dhaalu Atoll)
 Giraavaru (Kaafu Atoll)
 Girifushi
 Gnaviyani Atoll
 Goidhoo (Baa Atoll)
 Goidhoo (Shaviyani Atoll)
 Gulheegaathuhuraa
 Gulhi (Kaafu Atoll)
 Guraidhoo (Kaafu Atoll)
 Guraidhoo (Thaa Atoll)
 Haa Alif Atoll
 Haa Dhaalu Atoll
 Haagevillaa
 Hadahaa
 Hagedhoo
 Haggnaameedhoo (Alif Dhaal Atoll)
 Hanimaadhoo (Haa Dhaalu Atoll)
 Hathifushi (Haa Alif Atoll)
 Heenamaagalaa
 Heenfaru
 Helengeli
 Henbadhoo
 Henbandhoo (Noonu Atoll)
 Himandhoo (Alif Alif Atoll)
 Himithi
 Himmafushi (Kaafu Atoll)
 Hinnavaru (Lhaviyani Atoll)
 Hirihuttaa
 Hirilandhoo (Thaa Atoll)
 Hirimaradhoo (Haa Dhaalu Atoll)
 Hithaadhoo (Baa Atoll)
 Hithaadhoo (Gaafu Alif Atoll)
 Hithaadhoogalaa
 Hithadhoo (Laamu Atoll)
 Hithadhoo (Seenu Atoll)
 Hiyafushi
 Hoandeddhoo (Gaafu Dhaalu Atoll)
 Hoarafushi (Haa Alif Atoll)
 Holhudhoo (Noonu Atoll)
 Hudhufusheefinolhu
 Hukurudhoo
 Hulhimendhoo (Gaafu Alif Atoll)
 Hulhudheli (Dhaalu Atoll)
 Hulhudhoo (Seenu Atoll)
 Hulhudhuffaaru (Raa Atoll)
 Hulhulé Island
 Hulhumeedhoo (Seenu Atoll)
 Hulhuvehi
 Hunadhoo
 Huraagandu
 Hurasdhoo
 Hurendhoo
 Huruelhi
 Huvadhoo Atoll
 Huvafen Fushi
 Huvahendhoo
 Idimaa
 Ihuru
 Inguraidhoo (Raa Atoll)
 Innafushi (Alif Dhaal Atoll)

Government of the Maldives
 Bank of Maldives
 Constitution of the Maldives
 Maldives Monetary Authority
 President of the Maldives

Foreign relations of the Maldives

 Foreign relations of the Maldives
 The Maldives and the Commonwealth of Nations
 India–Maldives relations
 Israel–Maldives relations
 Japan–Maldives relations
 Malaysia–Maldives relations
 Maldives–Pakistan relations
 Maldives–Sri Lanka relations
 Maldives–United States relations
 Economic aid to Maldives
 Maldivian diplomatic missions
 South Asia Co-operative Environment Programme
 South Asian Association for Regional Cooperation

Sultans of the Maldives
 Abdul Majeed Didi
 Dhiyamigili dynasty
 Muhammad Fareed Didi
 Haajee Imaaduddeen
 Hassan Nooraddeen I
 Hassan Nooraddeen Iskandar II
 Hilaalee dynasty
 House of Theemuge
 Huraa dynasty
 Ibrahim Nooraddeen
 Isdhoo dynasty
 Mohamed bin Hajj Ali Thukkala
 Muhammad Imaaduddeen IV
 Muhammad Imaaduddeen V
 Muhammad Mueenuddeen I
 Muhammad Mueenuddeen II
 Muhammad Shamsuddeen III
 Zakwaan dynasty(short people)
 Nasiruddin I Sri Veeru Abarana Mahaa Radun
 Sultan Al-Haj Muhammed Ghiya'as ud-din Iskandar Sri Kula Sundara Maha Radun
 Sultan Muhammad Mu'iz ud-din Iskander ibni al-Marhum Shah Ghazi al-Hasan 'Izz ud-din
 Sultan Muhammad Shams ud-din Iskandar II
 Sultan al-Ghazi al-Hasan 'Izz ud-din Sri Kula Ranmiba Danala Kirti Kattiri Buwana Maha Radun
 Utheemu dynasty
 List of Sultans of the Maldives

Health in the Maldives

Healthcare in the Maldives

History of the Maldives
 History of the Maldives
 Abdullah Afeef
 Abdul Majeed Didi
 Black Friday (Maldives)
 Dhiyamigili dynasty
 Effect of the 2004 Indian Ocean earthquake on the Maldives
 Giraavaru (Kaafu Atoll)
 Hilaalee dynasty
 House of Theemuge
 Huraa dynasty
 Isdhoo dynasty
 Prince Abdulla
 François Pyrard de Laval
 RAF Gan
 Second Republic (Maldive Islands)
 United Suvadive Republic
 Utheemu dynasty
 Zakwaan dynasty(short people)

Elections in the Maldives
 Elections in the Maldives

Riots and civil unrest in the Maldives
 2003 Maldives civil unrest
 2005 Maldives civil unrest

Suvadives
 United Suvadive Republic

History of the Suvadives
 Abdullah Afeef

Maldivian law
 Constitution of the Maldives
 National Law Library of the Maldives

Maldivian judges

Qazis of the Maldives
 List of Qazis of the Maldives
 Mohamed bin Hajj Ali Thukkala
 Ustaz Mohamed Rasheed Ibrahim

Military of the Maldives
 Military of the Maldives
 Maldives National Defence Force
 Maldivian Coast Guard
 Special Forces

Organisations based in the Maldives
 Maldives Girl Guide Association
 The Scout Association of Maldives

Political parties in the Maldives
 List of political parties in the Maldives
 Gaumee Itthihaad(GIP)
 Dhivehi Rayyithunge Party
 Islamic Democratic Party (Maldives)
 Justice Party (Maldives)
 Maldivian Democratic Party

Maldivian people
 See List of Maldivians

Politics of the Maldives
 Politics of the Maldives

Maldivian politicians
 Maumoon Abdul Gayoom
 Alhan Fahmy 
 Dr. Mohammed Waheed Hassan
 Hassan Saeed
 Nasreena Ibrahim
 Fathulla Jameel
 Mohamed Latheef
 Mohamed Latheef (ambassador)
 Dunya Maumoon
 Mohamed Amin Didi
 Mohamed Munavvar
 Mohamed Nasheed
 Mohamed Zahir Hussain
 Ibrahim Nasir
 Ahmed Thasmeen Ali
 Fathimath Dhiyana Saeed

Religion in the Maldives
 Islam in the Maldives
 Catholic Church in the Maldives
 Hinduism in Maldives

Maldivian society
 Demographics of the Maldives

Sport in the Maldives

Football in the Maldives
 Football Association of Maldives
 Maldives national football team

Maldivian football clubs
 Club Valencia
 New Radiant
 Victory SC
 Thoddoo FC

Maldives football competitions
 Dhivehi League

Football venues in Maldives
 Rasmee Dhandu Stadium

Maldives at the Olympics
 Maldives at the 1988 Summer Olympics
 Maldives at the 1992 Summer Olympics
 Maldives at the 1996 Summer Olympics
 Maldives at the 2000 Summer Olympics
 Maldives at the 2004 Summer Olympics
 Maldives at the 2008 Summer Olympics
 Maldives at the 2012 Summer Olympics
 Maldives at the 2016 Summer Olympics
 Maldives at the 2020 Summer Olympics

Tourism in the Maldives
 Tourism in the Maldives
 Ithaa

Airlines of the Maldives
 Maldivian
 Manta Air
 Trans Maldivian Airways
 Flyme

Defunct airlines of the Maldives
 Maldives International Airlines
 Maldives Airways
 Mega Maldives
 Inter Atoll Air
 Seagull Airways
 Air Maldives
 Air Equator
 Ocean Air
 Maldivian Air Taxi

Transport in the Maldives
 Transport in the Maldives

Aviation in the Maldives

Maldives stubs
 Template:Maldives-stub
 Template:Maldives-bio-stub
 .mv
 Aafathis Daily
 Abdul Majeed Didi
 Abdullah Afeef
 Ahmed Thasmeen Ali
 Air Maldives
 Ali Rameez
 Aminiyya School
 Bokkura
 Club Valencia
 Constitution of the Maldives
 Culture of the Maldives
 Dharumavantha School
 Dhivehi Rayyithunge Party
 Dhivehi Writing Systems
 Dhiyamigili dynasty
 Dhoni
 Dunya Maumoon
 Economic aid to Maldives
 Education in the Maldives
 Elections in the Maldives
 Emblem of Maldives
 Eveyla Akuru
 Fathimath Shafeega
 Fathulla Jameel
 Foreign relations of the Maldives
 Ghiyasuddin School
 Haajee Imaaduddeen
 Haama Daily
 Hassan Nooraddeen I
 Hassan Nooraddeen Iskandar II
 Hassan Saeed
 Hilaalee dynasty
 House of Theemuge
 Huraa dynasty
 Ibrahim Nooraddeen
 Imran Mohamed
 Isdhoo dynasty
 Islamic Centre (Maldives)
 Islamic Democratic Party (Maldives)
 Jazeeraa Daily
 Justice Party (Maldives)
 List of newspapers in Maldives
 Majlis of the Maldives
 Maldives College of Higher Education
 Maldives Girl Guide Association
 Maldives Monetary Authority
 Maldives at the 1988 Summer Olympics
 Maldives at the 1992 Summer Olympics
 Maldives at the 1996 Summer Olympics
 Maldives at the 2000 Summer Olympics
 Maldives national football team
 Maldivian Air Taxi
 Maldivian laari
 Malé English School
 Miadhu Daily
 Military of the Maldives
 Minivan Daily
 Mohamed Amin Didi
 Mohamed Latheef
 Mohamed Munavvar
 Mohamed Zahir Hussain
 Mohamed bin Hajj Ali Thukkala
 Muhammad Fareed Didi
 Muhammad Imaaduddeen IV
 Muhammad Imaaduddeen V
 Muhammad Mueenuddeen I
 Muhammad Mueenuddeen II
 Muhammad Shamsuddeen III
 Nasreena Ibrahim
 National Law Library of the Maldives
 Naushad Waheed
 New Radiant
 President of the Maldives
 Prince Abdulla
 Raajjé Online
 Rasmee Dhandu Stadium
 Second Republic (Maldive Islands)
 Steven Jon Halasz
 Sultan Muhammad Mu'iz ud-din Iskander ibni al-Marhum Shah Ghazi al-Hasan 'Izz ud-din
 Sultan Muhammad Shams ud-din Iskandar II
 Sultan Saeed
 Sultan al-Ghazi al-Hasan 'Izz ud-din Sri Kula Ranmiba Danala Kirti Kattiri Buwana Maha Radun
 Television Maldives
 The Scout Association of Maldives
 Theemuge
 Three Ages of Maldivian Literature
 Trade unions in Maldives
 Ustaz Mohamed Rasheed Ibrahim
 Utheemu dynasty

See also
 Lists of country-related topics - similar lists for other countries